This is a list of public housing estates on the outlying islands of Hong Kong.

Overview

Cheung Kwai Estate

Cheung Kwai Estate is the first public housing estate on Cheung Chau. It consists of 18 residential blocks and accommodates 1,800 people.

Nga Ning Court

Nga Ning Court is a public housing estate on Cheung Chau. It has 3 residential blocks completed in 2001. It was originally a HOS estate, but the government decided to convert it to rental housing.

Kam Peng Estate

Kam Peng Estate is the only public housing estate on Peng Chau. It has only one residential block built in 1996.

Peng Lai Court

Peng Lai Court is the only Home Ownership Scheme court on Peng Chau. It has only one residential block built in 1996.

See also
 Public housing in Hong Kong
 List of public housing estates in Hong Kong

References

Islands of Hong Kong
 
 
Peng Chau
Cheung Chau